Les Hanigan (born 19 November 1945) is an Australian former professional rugby league footballer who played in the 1960s and 1970s. An Australian international and New South Wales representative , he played club football in Illawarra for Collegians, in Sydney for Manly-Warringah and in North Queensland for Proserpine.

A pro runner from Wollongong, Hanigan was selected to represent Southern New South Wales against the touring Great Britain team in 1966, scoring a try. He signed on to play in Sydney's NSWRFL competition with the Manly-Warringah club in 1967. That year he set a new club record for most tries in a match when he scored five tries in a match against competition newcomers, Cronulla-Sutherland. After playing for New South Wales, he scored two tries in Australia's First Test win over New Zealand. By the end of the 1967 NSWRFL season he had scored sixteen tries, the most in the competition, before being selected to tour with the 1967-68 Kangaroos. Hanigan played in 11 games on tour but no Tests. With Manly-Warringah he reached the 1968 NSWRFL season's grand final and played on the wing in the loss to Souths. 

After his time with Manly, Hanigan moved north to captain-coach Queensland's Proserpine club. From here he was selected to represent North Queensland.

References

1945 births
Living people
Australia national rugby league team players
Australian rugby league coaches
Australian rugby league players
Country New South Wales rugby league team players
Manly Warringah Sea Eagles players
New South Wales rugby league team players
Rugby league centres
Rugby league players from Wollongong